Sharon Wyatt (born February 13, 1953) is an American soap opera actress.

Career
Wyatt portrayed Tiffany Hill on the daytime soap General Hospital from July 14, 1981 to July 10, 1984 and again from July 30, 1986 to February 24, 1995.

From 2005 to 2006 Wyatt played the role of Rachel Barrett on Passions. In 2008, Wyatt reprised her role of Tiffany on the two-part season two finale of General Hospital: Night Shift.

Sept 1998 Just Shoot Me Season 3 Episode 2 Steamed as Greta

Personal life
Wyatt cared for her elderly mother in Tennessee until her mother's death on April 9, 2012.

In 2011 Wyatt announced that she was suffering from osteonecrosis in her jaw, which she believed was the result of her use of the Merck & Co. drug Fosamax.

References

External links
 

1953 births
Living people
People from Lebanon, Tennessee
American film actresses
American soap opera actresses
American television actresses
21st-century American women